Mukah Airport  is an airport in Mukah, a town in the state of Sarawak in Malaysia.

History

Old STOLport
The old STOLport (Short Take-Off and Landing airport) was opened in 1960s and could only handle 67 passengers at one time. The STOLport was equipped with a 1,097-meter bitumen runway. In 2020, the STOLport handled 29,011 passengers and 3,150 aircraft movements annually.

The old STOLport saw its last day of operations on 16 June 2021 with the final flight departing for Miri at 1.20pm.

New airport
In April 2009, the federal government allocated RM436 million for a new airport in Mukah. As at 2020, the airport cost was revealed to be RM360 million by Deputy Chief Minister James Jemut Masing. Works began in July 2017 and were scheduled for completion by August 2020. The main contractors in this project were Ibraco Construction Sdn. Bhd. and Hock Peng Furniture & General Contractor Sdn. Bhd. Due to the Movement Control Order, the airport was expected to be operational in the second quarter of 2021, later than previously scheduled.

The airport began its operation on 17 June 2021 with the first plane, MASwings’ MH3412 Twin Otter from Miri landing at 10.05am. The same Twin Otter later made the first take off from the airport to Kuching at 10.25am. 

The RM300 million new airport is located 7km from Mukah town is built upon  of land area, with a  terminal building, runway, Air Traffic Control Tower, offices, VIP Building, fire station and passenger waiting facilities. Other airport stakeholders’ offices are housed here as well, namely the Civil Aviation Authority of Malaysia (CAAM) and the Malaysian Meteorological Department (MET). This new airport is also equipped with 100 parking bays, 20 taxi parking bays, 20 motorcycle parking bays and 2 bus parking bays. The new airport can accommodate up to 264,000 passengers annually and larger aircraft if needed. The airport utilizes full LED airfield ground lighting (AGL) system, making it the first fully LED monitored airport in Malaysia.

Airlines and destinations

Traffic and statistics

See also
 List of airports in Malaysia

References

External links

Airports in Sarawak
Mukah District